John Francis Lewis (13 September 1901 –  3 July 1973) was an Australian rules footballer in the (then) Victorian Football League, playing for both North Melbourne and Melbourne clubs.

Lewis, 191 cm and 99 kg, was a tough, hard ruckman who could carry the rucking load for the team during tough periods.

In 1926, Lewis applied for a clearance to coach the Rutherglen Football Club in the Ovens and Murray Football League, but his clearance was refused by North Melbourne.

In 1996 Lewis was inducted into the Australian Football Hall of Fame.

His brother, John Joseph "Bill" Lewis (1909–1949), played VFL football for North Melbourne. Lewis's great-grandson Daniel Venables played for the West Coast Eagles in the Australian Football League.

Notes

References

External links
 Johnny Lewis at The VFA Project.
 AFL Hall of Fame

1901 births
North Melbourne Football Club (VFA) players
North Melbourne Football Club players
North Melbourne Football Club coaches
Melbourne Football Club players
Australian Football Hall of Fame inductees
Australian rules footballers from Melbourne
1973 deaths
People from West Melbourne, Victoria